The Mubende–Kyegegwa–Kyenjojo–Fort Portal Road, also Mubende–Fort Portal Road is a road in the Central and Western Regions of Uganda, connecting the towns of Mubende, in Mubende District, Kyegegwa in Kyegegwa District, Kyenjojo in Kyenjojo District and Fort Portal in Kabarole District.

Location
The coordinates of the road, near Kyenjojo, are 0°36'21.0"N, 30°39'41.0"E (Latitude:0.605836; Longitude:30.661390).

Overview
This road is part of the Kampala–Mityana–Mubende–Fort Portal transport corridor. It is part of the East African road network, connecting Kenya, Uganda and DR Congo. It is the primary gateway for tourists while visiting Kibaale National Park.

Upgrading to bitumen
The road was upgraded to class II bituminous standard between 2001 and 2003.

See also
 Kyenjojo–Kabwoya Road
 Uganda National Roads Authority

References

External links
 Webpage of Uganda National Road Authority
  Uganda’s Road Network has improved significantly
 Two killed in Mubende highway crash

Roads in Uganda
Kabarole District
Kyenjojo District
Kyegegwa District
Mubende District
Central Region, Uganda